World Theatre Day (WTD) is an international observance celebrated on 27 March. It was initiated in 1961 by the International Theatre Institute.

Initiation
World Theatre Day was initiated in 1962 by the International Theatre Institute (ITI). It is celebrated annually on 27 March by ITI Centres and the international theatre community. Various national and international theatre events are organized to mark this occasion. One of the most important of these is the circulation of the World Theatre Day International Message through which at the invitation of ITI, a figure of world stature shares his or her reflections on the theme of Theatre and a Culture of Peace. The first World Theatre Day International Message was written by Jean Cocteau (France) in 1962. It was first in Helsinki, and then in Vienna at the 9th World Congress of the ITI in June 1961 that President Arvi Kivimaa proposed on behalf of the Finnish Centre of the International Theatre Institute that a World Theatre Day be instituted. The proposal, backed by the Scandinavian centres, was carried with acclamation.

References

External links
 
 About the World Theatre Day at International Theatre Institute
 [World Theatre Day Nepal Celebrated at Basantpur Nepal https://theatre.com.np/blog/happy-world-theatre-day-2021/]

Theatrical organizations
March observances
Recurring events established in 1961
1961 in theatre

It is observed every year for the nourishing of the drama and fine arts